Charlie Bird Explores is the title of a series of documentary films shot by RTÉ News and Current Affairs chief news correspondent Charlie Bird, in which the reporter sets off to explore some of the most beautiful and remote places in the far corners of the planet Earth and moans about having to do so. The series broadcast over a number of years features Bird's adventures in the Arctic, the Ganges and the Amazon. The documentaries are produced by Crossing the Line Films.

For his Amazon journey, Bird crossed South America from ocean to ocean, tracing the course of the Amazon River, and somewhat annoyingly to many viewers, complained about everything associated with the Amazon along the way. En route he tells the story of this region and how it plays a crucial role in global warming and environmental change. For his Ganges trek, Bird took a path from the sea to the river's source, battling from the Bay of Bengal to the Himalayas along the river. In the Arctic, filmed in 2008, Bird met the Inuit community in Grise Fiord, Nunavut.

References

External links
 Charlie Bird Explores at RTÉ Television

Irish documentary television series
RTÉ original programming